ADVMoto Magazine (also known as Adventure Motorcycle Magazine; founded in 1999) is a US-based adventure and dual-sport motorcycle magazine. It covers adventure motorcycle travel and sport topics, such as rally and enduro racing. ADVMoto Magazine is currently headquartered in Fairfax, Virginia.

History
ADVMoto Magazine began in Southern California in 1997 as a Kawasaki KLR650 newsletter. As the community grew, it went from a print newsletter to a full print magazine format titled Dual Sport News in 1999.

In August 2006, its name changed to Adventure Motorcycle & Dual Sport News, which remained the publication’s title until 2011. The 2008 economic crash pushed the title into a digital-only format under the same name until 2010. That year, Motocyclops took over the magazine and renamed it as ADVMoto. In 2011, printed copies were made available at newsstands in the United States, Canada, and Australia.

In the past two years, they have also published comics and illustrated art, launching both a comic book series titled Far-Rider Adventures and a single panel comic series titled The Far-Ride.

References

External links

YouTube
Radio
ADVMoto Rally and Events

Magazines established in 1999
Magazines published in Virginia
Monthly magazines published in the United States
Motorcycle magazines published in the United States